Turn of the Century (Swedish: När seklet var ungt) is a 1944 Swedish drama film directed by Gunnar Olsson and starring Edvard Persson, Stina Hedberg and Marianne Gyllenhammar. It was shot at the Sundbyberg Studios and on location around Viken and Lessebo. The film's sets were designed by the art director Max Linder.

Synopsis
At the beginning of the twentieth century in Scania a large-scale farmer hires in cheap immigrant labourers to work his lands, leading to unemployment amongst the locals. At the same time a new schoolteacher arrives with socialist leanings. He champions the rights of the farmhands and falls in love with the daughter of the squire.

Cast
 Edvard Persson as 	Squire Munthe
 Stina Hedberg as	Mrs. Munthe
 Marianne Gyllenhammar as 	Hillevi Munthe
 Claes Thelander as Yngve Sjöö
 Walter Sarmell as 	Ferdinand
 Mim Persson as 	Hanna
 Fritiof Billquist as 	Meier
 Ivar Kåge as 	Severin
 John Norrman as 	Fahlen
 Nils Nordståhl as 	Läns
 Erik Rosén as Vicar
 Axel Högel as 	Policeman
 Bullan Weijden as Malin
 Karl Erik Flens as 	The Limp
 Karl Nygren-Kloster as 	Mats

References

Bibliography 
 Paietta, Ann C. Teachers in the Movies: A Filmography of Depictions of Grade School, Preschool and Day Care Educators, 1890s to the Present. McFarland, 2007.

External links 
 

1944 films
1944 drama films
1940s Swedish-language films
Films directed by Gunnar Olsson
Films based on Swedish novels
Films set in the 1900s
Swedish historical drama films
1940s historical drama films
1940s Swedish films